Bamboleo (Spanish, 'I sway') may refer to:

 Bamboleo (band), a Cuban salsa band
 Bamboleo, a nickname for Eudalio Arriaga, Colombian football player
 "BAMBOLEO", a 2022 song by Red Velvet
 "Bamboleo", a 1997 song by Garcia
 "Bamboléo", a 1987 song by Gipsy Kings